Jonardon Ganeri, FBA, is a philosopher, specialising in philosophy of mind and in South Asian and Buddhist philosophical traditions. He holds the Bimal Matilal Distinguished Professorship in Philosophy at the University of Toronto. He was Global Network Professor in the College of Arts and Science, New York University, previously having taught at several universities in Britain. Ganeri graduated from Churchill College, Cambridge, with his undergraduate degree in mathematics, before completing a DPhil in philosophy at University and Wolfson Colleges, Oxford. He has published eight monographs, and is the editor of the Oxford Handbook of Indian Philosophy. He is on the editorial board of the Stanford Encyclopedia of Philosophy, the British Journal for the History of Philosophy, Philosophy East & West, Analysis, and other journals and monograph series.  His research interests are in consciousness, self, attention, the epistemology of inquiry, the idea of philosophy as a practice and its relationship with literature. He works  on the history of ideas in early modern South Asia, intellectual affinities between India and Greece, and Buddhist philosophy of mind, teaches courses in the philosophy of mind, the nature of subjectivity, Buddhist philosophy, the history of Indian philosophical traditions, and supervises graduate students on South Asian philosophical texts in a cross-cultural context.  He is a prominent advocate for an expanded role for cross-cultural methodologies in philosophical research, and for enhanced cultural diversity in the philosophical curriculum. Jonardon Ganeri is the inventor of the idea of "cosmopolitan philosophy" as a new discipline within philosophy.

Philosophical Work 
In the philosophy of mind, Jonardon Ganeri advances the view, in his book The Self, that our concept of self is constitutively grounded in the fact that subjects are beings who own their ideas, emotions, wishes, and feelings. He argues that the self is a unity of three strands of ownedness: normative, phenomenological, and subpersonal. In a different book, Attention, Not Self, he argues that when early Buddhists deny that there is a self, what they are rejecting is the conception of self as the willing agent, an inner origin of willed directives. For early Buddhists like Buddhaghosa the real nature of mental activity is in the ways we pay attention. So the relation between the two books is that Attention, Not Self clears the ground for the sort of conception of self defended in The Self. His earlier book, The Concealed Art of the Soul, explores thinking about selfhood in a range of Upaniṣadic, Vedāntic, Yogācāra and Mādhyamika philosophers, under the rubric of the idea that the self is something that conceals itself from itself.

In the history of philosophy, Ganeri argues that modernity is not a uniquely European achievement. In The Lost Age of Reason, he shows how there emerges in 17th century India a distinctive version of modernity in the work of the so-called “new reason” (Navya-nyāya) philosophers of Bengal, Mithilā, and Benares. These thinkers confronted the past and thought of themselves as doing something very new, as intellectual innovators. The innovativeness of this group of philosophers is also the subject of his earlier book, Semantic Powers, revised and restructured for the second edition entitled Artha, which aims to demonstrate that they made discoveries in linguistics and the philosophy of language which were not seen in Europe until the late 20th century. These include discoveries about the meaning of proper names, pronominal anaphora, testimony, and the relationship between epistemology and meaning theory.

Ganeri has also written about the philosophy of the Portuguese poet Fernando Pessoa. His book, Virtual Subjects, Fugitive Selves, is the first English language monograph about Pessoa's philosophy written by a philosopher. Ganeri argues that Pessoa's notion of the heteronym can be used to solve some of the trickiest puzzles in the global history of the philosophy of self.

Honours and awards 
In 2015, Ganeri was elected a Fellow of the British Academy (FBA), the United Kingdom's national academy for the humanities and social sciences. Also in 2015, Ganeri won the Infosys Prize in the category of humanities, the first philosopher to do so. Ganeri delivered the 2009 Pranab. K. Sen Memorial Lecture at Jadavpur University, Kolkata, the 2016 Brian O'Neil Memorial Lectures at the University of New Mexico, and the 2017 Daya Krishna Memorial Lecture at the University of Rajasthan. In 2019, Ganeri delivered a convocation address at Ashoka University, Delhi.

Writings

Books 
Inwardness: An Outsider's Guide (Columbia University Press, 2021).
Virtual Subjects, Fugitive Selves: Fernando Pessoa and his Philosophy (Oxford University Press, 2020).
Classical Indian Philosophy (Oxford University Press, 2021), co-authored with Peter Adamson.
Attention, Not Self (Oxford University Press, 2017/2020).
 (ed) The Oxford Handbook of Indian Philosophy (Oxford University Press, 2017/2021).
The Self: Naturalism, Consciousness and the First-Person Stance (Oxford University Press, 2012/2015).
The Lost Age of Reason: Philosophy in Early Modern India 1450–1700 (Oxford University Press, 2011/2014).
The Concealed Art of the Soul: Theories of Self and Practices of Truth in Indian Ethics and Epistemology (Oxford University Press, 2007).
Artha: Testimony and the Theory of Meaning in Indian Philosophical Analysis (Oxford University Press, 2006).
Philosophy in Classical India: The Proper Work of Reason (Routledge, 2001).
Semantic Powers (Oxford University Press, 1999).

Selected Essays 

 “Is this me? A story about personal identity from the Mahāprajñāpāramitopadeśa/ Dà zhìdù lùn,” British Journal of the History of Philosophy 29.5 (2021), pp. 739–762, with Jing Huang.  
 “Pessoa’s imaginary India,” in Fernando Pessoa & Philosophy, edited by Bartholomew Ryan, Giovanbattista Tusa, and Antonio Cardiello (Boulder, Co.: Rowman & Littlefield, 2021). 
 “Epistemic pluralism: from systems to stances,” Journal of the American Philosophical Association (2019): 1–21. 
 “Mental time travel and attention,” Australasian Philosophical Review 1.4 (2018): 353–373.  
 “Epistemology from a Sanskritic point of view,” in Epistemology for the Rest of the World, edited by Masaharu Mizumoto, Stephen Stich and Eric McCready (Oxford: Oxford University Press, 2018), pp. 12–21.  
 “Illusions of immortality,” in Imaginations of Death and Beyond in India and Europe, edited by Sudhir Kakar and Günter Blamberger (Delhi: Springer, 2018), pp. 35–45. 
 “What is philosophy? A cross-cultural conversation in the cross-roads court of Chosroes,” The Harvard Review of Philosophy 24 (Spring 2017): 1–8. 
 “The wandering ascetic and the manifest world,” in Hindu Law: A New History of Dharmaśāstra, edited by Patrick Olivelle and Don Davis (Oxford: Oxford University Press, 2017), pp. 442–454. 
 “Attention to greatness: Buddhaghosa,” in Stephen Hetherington ed., What Makes a Philosopher Great? (London: Routledge, 2017), pp. 67–85. 
 “Freedom in thinking: Intellectual decolonisation and the immersive cosmopolitanism of K. C. Bhattacharyya,” in The Oxford Handbook of Indian Philosophy (Oxford: Oxford University Press, 2017), pp. 718–736. 
 “Śrīharṣa’s dissident epistemology: Of knowledge as assurance,” in The Oxford Handbook of Indian Philosophy (Oxford: Oxford University Press, 2017), pp. 522–538. 
 “Philosophical modernities: polycentricity and early modernity in India,” Royal Institute of Philosophy Supplement 74 (2014): 75–94. 
 “Philosophy as a way of life: spiritual exercises from the Buddha to Tagore,” in Philosophy as a Way of Life: Ancients and Moderns. Essays in Honour of Pierre Hadot, edited by Michael Chase, Stephen Clark and Michael McGhee (Oxford: Blackwell Publishing, 2014), pp. 116–131. 
 “Dārā Shikoh and the transmission of the Upaniṣads to Islam,” in Migrating Texts and Traditions, edited by William Sweet (Ottawa: University of Ottawa Press, 2012), pp. 150–161. 
 “The geography of shadows: souls and cities in Philip Pullman’s His Dark Materials,” Philosophy & Literature 35 (2011): 269–281, with Panayiota Vassilopoulou. 
 “Apoha, feature-placing, and sensory content,” in Buddhist Semantics and Human Cognition, edited by Arindam Chakrabarti, Mark Siderits and Tom Tillemans (New York: Columbia University Press, 2011), pp. 228–246. 
 “Emergentisms, ancient and modern,” Mind 120 (July 2011): 671–703. 
 “Subjectivity, selfhood, and the use of the word ‘I’,” in Self, No-self ?, edited by Dan Zahavi, Evan Thomson and Mark Siderits (Oxford: Oxford University Press, 2010), pp. 176–192. 
 “Can you seek the answer to this question? The paradox of inquiry in India,” Australasian Journal of Philosophy 88 (2010): 571–594, with Amber Carpenter. 
 “Intellectual India: reason, identity, dissent”, New Literary History 40.2 (2009): 248–263.  
 “Sanskrit philosophical commentary: reading as philosophy”, Journal of the Indian Council of Philosophical Research 25.1 (2008): 107–127. 
 “What you are you do not see, what you see is your shadow: The philosophical double in Mauni’s fiction,” in The Poetics of Shadows: The Double in Literature and Philosophy, edited by Andrew Hock Soon Ng (Hanover: Ibidem-Verlag, March 2008). pp. 109–122. 
 “Towards a formal regimentation of the Navya-Nyāya technical language I,” in Logic, Navya-Nyāya and Applications: Homage to Bimal Krishna Matilal, edited by Mihir Chakraborty, Benedikt Loewe and Madhabendra Mitra (London: College Publications, 2008), pp. 109–124. 
 “Contextualism in the study of Indian philosophical cultures,” Journal of Indian Philosophy 36 (2008): 551–562. 
 “Universals and other generalities,” in Peter F. Strawson and Arindam Chakrabarti, eds. Universals, Concepts and Qualities: New Essays on the Meaning of Predicates (London: Ashgate 2006), pp. 51–66. 
 “Ancient Indian logic as a theory of case-based reasoning,” Journal of Indian Philosophy 31 (2003): 33–45.  
 “An irrealist theory of self,” The Harvard Review of Philosophy 12 (Spring 2004): 61–80. 
 “The ritual roots of moral reason,” in Thinking Through Rituals: Philosophical Perspectives, edited by Kevin Schilbrack (London: Routledge, 2004), pp. 207–233.  
 “Indian Logic”, in Handbook of the History of Logic, Volume 1: Greek, Indian and Arabic Logic, edited by D.M. Gabbay and J. Woods (North Holland: Elsevier, 2004), pp. 255–332. 
 “Jaina logic and the philosophical basis of pluralism”, History and Philosophy of Logic 23 (2002): 267–281. 
 “Worlds in conflict: Yaśovijaya Gaṇi’s cosmopolitan vision,” International Journal of Jaina Studies 4.1 (2008): 1–11. 
 “Objectivity and proof in a classical Indian theory of number”, Synthese 129.3 (2001): 413–437. 
 “Argumentation, dialogue and the Kathāvatthu,” Journal of Indian Philosophy 29.4 (2001): 485–493. 
 “Cross-modality and the self,” Philosophy and Phenomenological Research 61.3 (2000): 639–658. 
 “Dharmakīrti’s semantics for the quantifier only”, in Shoryu Katsura ed., Dharmakīrti’s Thought and Its Impact on Indian and Tibetan Philosophy (Wien: Verlag der Österreichischen Akademie Der Wissenschaften, 1999), pp. 101–116.

References 

Year of birth missing (living people)
Living people
Alumni of Churchill College, Cambridge
Alumni of University College, Oxford
Alumni of Wolfson College, Oxford
British philosophers
Fellows of the British Academy
New York University faculty